Leucius, called Leucius Charinus by Photios I of Constantinople in the ninth century, is the name applied to a cycle of what M. R. James termed "Apostolic romances" that seems to have had wide currency long before a selection was read aloud at the Second Council of Nicaea (787) and rejected. Leucius is not among the early heretical teachers mentioned by name in Irenaeus' Adversus haereses (ca. 180).  Most of the works seem to have come into existence in the mid-third century.

The fullest account of Leucius is that given by Photius (Codex 114), who describes a book, called The Circuits of the Apostles, which contained the Acts of Peter, John, Andrew, Thomas, and Paul, that was purported to have been written by "Leucius Charinus" which he judged full of folly, self-contradiction, falsehood, and impiety (Wace); Photius is the only source to give his second name, "Charinus".  Epiphanius (Haer. 51.427) made Leucius a disciple of John who joined his master in opposing the Ebionites, a characterization that appears unlikely, since other patristic writers agree that the cycle attributed to him was docetic, which denies the humanity of Jesus as Christ.  Augustine knew the cycle, which he attributed to "Leutius", which his adversary Faustus of Mileve thought had been wrongly excluded from the New Testament canon by the Catholics. Gregory of Tours found a copy of the Acts of Andrew from the cycle and made an epitome of it, omitting the "tiresome" elaborations of detail he found in it.

The "Leucian Acts" are as follows:

The Acts of John
The Acts of Peter
The Acts of Paul
The Acts of Andrew
The Acts of Thomas

The Leucian Acts were most likely redacted at a later date to express a more orthodox view. Of the five, the Acts of John and Thomas have the most remaining Gnostic content.

Notes

External links
Henry Wace, Biographical Dictionary: Leucius

3rd-century Christians
Christian writers
Gnosticism
Reception of New Testament apocrypha

Gnostics